Federica Nicolai (born 2 March 1995) is an Italian professional racing cyclist. She rides for the S.C. Michela Fanini Rox team.

See also
 List of 2015 UCI Women's Teams and riders

References

1995 births
Living people
Italian female cyclists
Place of birth missing (living people)
21st-century Italian people